Hibbertia mulligana is a species of flowering plant in the family Dilleniaceae and is endemic to north-eastern Queensland. It is a sub-shrub with narrow elliptic leaves and yellow flowers with 70 to 74 stamens arranged around three densely hairy carpels.

Description 
Both sides of the leaves, but especially the lower surface, are covered with star-shaped hairs and the edges of the leaves curve downwards.

Taxonomy 
Hibbertia mulligana was first formally described in 1991 by Sally T. Reynolds in the journal Austrobaileya from specimens collected on Mount Mulligan in 1984. The specific epithet (mulligana) refers to the type location.

Distribution and habitat 

Conservation status
This hibbertia is classified as of "least concern" under the Queensland Government Nature Conservation Act 1992.

See also 
 List of Hibbertia species

References 

mulligana
Flora of Queensland
Plants described in 1991
Taxa named by Sally T. Reynolds